The men's 1500 metres at the 1998 European Athletics Championships was held at the Népstadion on 18 and 20 August.

Medalists

Results

Round 1
Qualification: First 4 in each heat (Q) and the next 4 fastest (q) advance to the Final.

Final

References

Results
Results
Results

1500
1500 metres at the European Athletics Championships